Roger Balian (born 18 January 1933) is a French-Armenian physicist who has worked on quantum field theory, quantum thermodynamics, and theory of measurement.
Balian is a member of French Académie des sciences (Academy of Sciences). His important work includes the Balian-Low theorem. He teaches statistical physics at the École Polytechnique.

Works
 

A. Aspect, R. Balian, G. Bastard, J.P. Bouchaud, B. Cabane, F. Combes, T. Encrenaz, S. Fauve, A. Fert, M. Fink, A. Georges, J.F. Joanny, D. Kaplan, D. Le Bihan, P. Léna, H. Le Treut, J-P Poirier, J. Prost et J.L. Puget, Demain la physique, (Odile Jacob, 2009) 

References

École Polytechnique alumni
Mines Paris - PSL alumni
Corps des mines
1933 births
Living people
French physicists
Armenian physicists
French people of Armenian descent
Members of the French Academy of Sciences